Fannyella is a genus of corals belonging to the family Primnoidae.

The species of this genus are found in southernmost Southern Hemisphere.

Species:

Fannyella abies 
Fannyella kuekenthali 
Fannyella rossii 
Fannyella spinosa

References

Primnoidae
Octocorallia genera